Khuroshvili is a Georgian surname. Notable people with the surname include:

Giorgi Khuroshvili (born 1988), Georgian philosopher
Valeryan Khuroshvili (born 1979), Belarusian swimmer

Georgian-language surnames